Giuseppe Calì (born 28 September 1952) is an Italian professional golfer.

Calì was born in Mirano. He turned professional in 1971 and has won twelve professional tournaments in his home country, including five in 1988.

Calì played on the European circuit from the mid-1980s to the late 1990s - sometimes on the European Tour itself and sometimes on the second tier Challenge Tour. His best results on the European Tour were sixth places at the 1990 Italian Open and the 1991 Mediterranean Open. In 1990 he won both the Cerruti Open and the Memorial Olivier Barras on the Challenge Tour and topped the Challenge Tour money rankings. He also claimed  more than a dozen non-tour regular career (i.e. under fifty)  professional tournaments.

Calì joined the European Seniors Tour in 2003, and has won the 2005 Mobile Cup and the 2006 London Seniors Masters at that level.

Calì represented Italy in the Alfred Dunhill Cup and the World Cup (four times each).

Professional wins (15)

Challenge Tour wins (2)
1990 Cerutti Open, Memorial Olivier Barras

Other wins (11)
1982 Cerutti Open
1984 Italian PGA Championship
1985 Italian Native Open
1987 Italian Native Open
1988 Open La Pinetina, Open di Firenze, Open del Lavoro Luigi, Italian PGA Championship, Cerutti Open
1993 Italian Native Open
1994 Italian Native Open

European Senior Tour wins (2)

European Senior Tour playoff record (1–0)

Team appearances
Dunhill Cup (representing Italy): 1986, 1987, 1991, 1992
World Cup (representing Italy): 1985, 1987, 1988, 1991

External links

Italian male golfers
European Tour golfers
European Senior Tour golfers
People from Mirano
Sportspeople from the Metropolitan City of Venice
1952 births
Living people